Taxi Ballad is a 2011 Lebanese comedy drama film directed by Daniel Joseph.

Plot
The film is made in a social context Comedy, a daily life of Beirut city through a young person suffering from frustration and Seeking to emigrate to America in search of a better future, or his failure to fulfill his dream, He decides that the taxi driver working and loves his profession, he discovers shortly after he began composed with city life and cares about the feelings of the people during the talking.

Cast
Hiam Abou Chedid as Mother
Habib Alberto as Ghassan the violinist
Sahar Assaf as Farah
Adnan Awad as Adnan the barber
Firas Barakat as Young Youssef
Khalil Bou Khalil as Abu Talal
Badih Abou Chakra as Kamal
Khaled El Sayed as Cafe Owner
Talal El-Jordi as Youssef
Wafa Celine Halawi as Farah's Sister
Karina Logue as Jordan
Mahmoud Mabsout as Abu Tony
Linda Mahdi as Yasmine Haidar
Ziad Makouk as Abu Omar
Manel Mallat as Singing Passenger
Omar Mikati as Old man in cab
Aïda Sabra as Auntie
Bakhos Safi as Carlo
Tarek Tamim as Tarek
Andre Bou Zeidas as Andre

References

External links

2010s Arabic-language films
2011 comedy-drama films
2011 films
Lebanese comedy-drama films